Benza English is a Japanese on demand comedy series that premiered on Amazon Prime Video via Prime Video Direct in April 2020 in the United States, United Kingdom, and Japan.  Shortly after, it began streaming in seventy additional territories.

The show is a spin-off of the Japanese on demand comedy series The Benza, and features Kyle (Kyle Card) and Chris (Christopher McCombs) as well as many other returning characters from the original show.  The main plot follows Kaori (Kaori Ikeda) who receives a mysterious offer to become the host of her own English language show and takes place between "The Benza" series 1 and series 2.
The eight-episode season was filmed entirely on location in Tokyo, Japan by co-directors Raito Nishizaka and Michael Williams.

History 

"Benza English" began as a corner in episode 4 of series 1 of The Benza, where Kaori Ikeda appeared as the host of an English educational show that helps characters by teaching inappropriate English.  The spin-off series was formally announced on the 26th of August in 2019 after Christopher McCombs won Best Actor and Janni Olsson won Best Supporting Actress for their roles of Chris and Alena respectively in the original series at Korea's Seoul Webfest.

Michael Williams was brought in to co-direct with returning director Raito Nishizaka.  Talking about the experience working with Raito Nishizaka with Asia Film Festival, Michael said, "Working in tandem with Raito was perfect. With both of us directing together, "Benza English" is an unprecedented show, combining Japanese and English humor together." Actress Haku Inko (Inko Sensei) was additionally promoted to Line Producer at the start of the production.

Creator and Producer Christopher McCombs said on Japanese news site Soranews, "With "The Benza", we focused on what life in Tokyo is like for a foreigner against the backdrop of a hyper-realistic comedy.  With "Benza English", we focused on the Japanese entertainment industry in general against the backdrop of a chaotic English language learning show."

Plot 

Kaori (Kaori Ikeda) is the host of an English language show that takes place in the world of The Benza.  She is assisted by Maria (Maria Papadopoulou) and Hamilton (Aver Hamilton) who introduce English phrases. The ghost Tamura (Masahito Kawahata) occasionally appears to explain difficult grammar.  Each episode focuses on a different theme and utilizes different characters from The Benza, like Inko Sensei (Haku Inko) and Alena Treasurehunter (Janni Olsson), to help introduce additional words and phrases related to the lesson.  The Benza main characters Chris (Christopher McCombs) and Kyle (Kyle Card) end each episode with a recap of the lesson.

Cast 
 Kaori Ikeda as Kaori
 Maria Papadopoulou as Maria
 Aver Hamilton II as Hamilton
 Kyle Card as Kyle
 Christopher McCombs as Chris.
 Haku Inko as Inko-sensei.
 Michiko Noguchi as Noguchi.
 Masahito Kawahata as Tamura.
 Janni Olsson as Alena.
 Lee Min Kuk as Lee.
 Alexander Hunter as David.
 Hannah Grace as Stephanie.
 Shizuka Anderson as Carol.

Episodes

Reception 
Japan Times writer Matt Schley wrote, “Like the main series, “Benza English” pokes fun at Japan and its occasionally awkward relationship with its non-Japanese population, though it just as often turns the tables. The fourth-wall-breaking characters even have some choice words for viewers who gave the original “The Benza” one-star reviews online."

Awards and honors 

The following are awards that have been earned by the cast and crew of "Benza English" series 1 in 2020:

Spin-off series

In 2020, a spin-off retro rpg video game called The Benza RPG was announced. It was initially released for iOS platforms in October 2020 and takes place between Benza English and series two of The Benza. The player primarily plays as Chris and Kyle as they try to save Higashi Nakano from Inko Sensei and save Lee who has been kidnapped.

References

External links 

 Benza English at Tokyo Cowboys Official Website
 

2019 web series debuts